Mano Destra (Italian for "right hand") is a 1986 Italian-language Swiss art film written, directed by and starring Cleo Übelmann. In black and white, Mano Destra is a study of lesbian erotic objectification which depicts a woman tying up another woman in a lengthy act of consensual bondage.

Images from the film were later published in 1988 as part of a book, The Dominas - Mano Destra by the Cleo Uebelmann-Group.

Accolades 
In Women and the New German Cinema, Julia Knight describes it as a film which explores the liberating possibilities of sadomasochism, subverting audience expectations of what sadomasochism is like. In New Queer Cinema, B. Ruby Rich described it as "deserving of instant cult status". 

In The Pleasure Threshold: Looking at Lesbian Pornography on Film, Cherry Smyth states that its imagery is "beyond sex", and that "like being offered an ice-cold, luscious fruit drink on a hot day, which you are forbidden to taste, this film encapsulates desire as death, as nothingness, and yet utter completeness".

The director Peter Strickland has cited the film as one of his sources of inspiration for his film The Duke of Burgundy.

In 2018, the British Film Institute cited Mano Destra as one of the best 30 LGBT films of all time.

References

Further reading 
 Cherry Smyth. The Pleasure Threshold: Looking at Lesbian Pornography on Film. Feminist Review, No. 34, Perverse Politics: Lesbian Issues (Spring, 1990), pp. 152–159

External links
 Entry for Mano Destra at the British Film Institute film database

 Entry for Mano Destra at the film's UK distributor

Lesbian-related films
Swiss LGBT-related films
1986 films
1986 drama films
BDSM in films
LGBT-related drama films
Swiss drama films

1986 LGBT-related films
1980s Italian-language films